Dylan McKalob Cole (born May 19, 1994) is an American football linebacker for the Tennessee Titans of the National Football League (NFL). He played college football at Missouri State, and went undrafted in the 2017 NFL Draft.

Professional career

Houston Texans

2017 season
Cole signed with the Houston Texans as an undrafted free agent on May 12, 2017. On October 1, 2017, Cole recorded his first NFL interception and returned it for a touchdown in a 57–14 home win over the Tennessee Titans. He recorded his first career sack as well. On October 15, 2017, Cole made his second career interception in the game against the Cleveland Browns. However, he injured his hamstring in the process of making the interception and had to be carried off the field.

2018 season
On September 25, 2018, Cole was placed on injured reserve after playing through a dislocated wrist in Week 3 against the New York Giants. He was activated off injured reserve on November 27, 2018.

2019 season
On November 23, 2019, Cole was placed on injured reserve after suffering a torn ACL in Week 12.

2020 season
On April 6, 2020, Cole was re-signed to a one-year, $2.133 million contract. He was placed on the active/physically unable to perform list at the start of training camp on July 31, 2020. He was moved back to the active roster on August 16. He was placed on the reserve/COVID-19 list by the team on November 5, and activated five days later. He was placed on injured reserve on November 14, 2020 with a back injury.

Tennessee Titans
On October 13, 2021, Cole was signed to the Tennessee Titans practice squad. He was released on October 26, then re-signed on November 6. Cole was elevated to the active roster for the Titans Week 10 matchup with the New Orleans Saints. On the kickoff to open the second half, Cole caused a fumble which resulted in a recovery for the Titans. He was signed to the active roster on November 16.

On March 23, 2022, Cole re-signed with the Titans.

References

1994 births
Living people
Players of American football from Missouri
Sportspeople from Springfield, Missouri
American football linebackers
Missouri State Bears football players
Houston Texans players
Tennessee Titans players
Ed Block Courage Award recipients